The 2012–13 season is Middlesbrough's fourth consecutive season in the Championship. They will also compete in the League Cup and the FA Cup.

Results and fixtures

Pre season

League Cup

FA Cup

Championship

Results summary

Results by matchday

Matches

Players

Captains

First team squad

Squad

|-
|colspan="14"|Players featured for club who have been sent out on loan:
|-
|colspan="14"|Players featured for club who have left:

|}

Disciplinary record

Suspensions served

Key:
(H) = League Home, (A) = League Away, (FA) = FA Cup, (CC) = League Cup

Top scorers

Penalties

Contracts

|-

|-

|-

|-

|-

Team statistics

League table

Transfers

Transfers in

Loans in

Transfers out

Loans out

Honours

References

Middlesbrough F.C. seasons
Middlesbrough